Pascal Lussier (born September 13, 1991) is a Canadian rower. He won a bronze medal at the 2015 Pan American Games in the men's double sculls event.

In 2016, Lussier qualified for the 2016 Summer Olympics by finishing in second place (and last qualifying position). in the men's quadruple sculls event at the last chance qualification event in Lausanne, Switzerland.

References

External links
 

1991 births
Living people
Canadian male rowers
Olympic rowers of Canada
Pan American Games bronze medalists for Canada
Pan American Games medalists in rowing
People from Saint-Jean-sur-Richelieu
Rowers at the 2015 Pan American Games
Rowers at the 2016 Summer Olympics
Sportspeople from Quebec
Medalists at the 2015 Pan American Games